Canadian public debt, or general government debt, is the liabilities of the government sector.  Government gross debt consists of liabilities that are a financial claim that requires payment of interest and/or principal in future.  They consist mainly of Treasury bonds, but also include public service employee pension liabilities.  Changes in government debt over time reflect primarily borrowing due to past government deficits (where a deficit occurs when government expenditures exceed revenues).

For 2021 (the fiscal year ending 31 March 2022), the market value of gross debt was $2,942 billion ($76,135 per capita) for the consolidated Canadian general government – federal, plus provincial, territorial and local governments (PTLGs) combined.  
As a ratio of GDP, gross debt was 117.2% (GDP was $2,510 billion in 2021), down from 130.0% in 2020, the highest level ever recorded, but significantly above the pre-pandemic level (105.6% in 2019).

The sustainability of government debt depends on sound fiscal management by the provincial, territorial and local governments (PTLGs), given that Canada is one of the world's most decentralized federations.  Approximately half of Canadian general government gross debt in 2021 was debt of the federal (central) government ($1,570 billion or 62.5% of GDP), and half was debt of the PTLGs.  Public debt is sustainable when it "does not grow continuously as a share of the economy". While the federal government's fiscal strategy was assessed as sustainable over the long-term, this was not the case for the subnational sector as a whole, according to a 2022 Parliamentary Budget Officer report.

General government net debt, or gross debt minus financial assets, reached $1,453 billion or 57.9% as a share of GDP in the fiscal year ending 31 March 2022.  This is down from 70.7% the year previously.  Federal government net debt, at $910 billion, or 36.3% of GDP, was above the pre-pandemic level, but was down from 42.7% of GDP in the previous year.

As of March 2022, Canada's DBRS AAA federal credit rating was maintained.

Alternative measures of government debt

Commonly-used government debt terms are gross debt, net debt, and debt securities liabilities.  These measures are often presented as a share of GDP, as in the table below, to gauge the size of debt relative to the size of the economy.  The debt-to-GDP ratio is a key indicator of the sustainability of government finance, according to the OECD.

Gross debt, also called "total debt", consists of all liabilities that require payment of principal or interest at some point in the future.  Gross debt is the commonly-used measure of debt in international comparisons by the IMF and the OECD.

Net Debt is gross debt minus financial assets.  It takes into account the financial assets governments hold, such as investments to cover the liabilities associated with civil servants' (government employee) pension plans.  An issue with calculating net debt is that some government assets are difficult to value.  Examples of difficult-to-value assets include nonmarketable equity investments, and loans that might never be repaid if the loan-receiving firms become insolvent.
Another issue with net debt is which government assets should be included.  The Department of Finance's method to calculate net debt has been criticized for including the assets (but not the liabilities) of the Canada Pension Plan (CPP) and Quebec Pension Plan (QPP).  Yakabuski and Clemens and Palacios argue that the Department of Finance methodology understates net debt, since CPP and QPP assets are set aside to pay for future public retirement plan benefits, so they are not available to also pay down government debt.

Debt securities liabilities are liabilities in the form of debt securities (chiefly bonds and bills.)  Government debt securities provide a useful measure of government debt as they are a large share of government debt (76.2% in 2020), and are relatively straightforward to measure.  By contrast, the second largest debt component, employee pension plan liabilities, are less easy to value as they depend on employee longevity and the pension plan investment returns over many years.

Debt securities can be valued at market value or at book value (also called the "nominal value").
The value of a debt security measured at market prices is most relevant for a purchaser (price varies with changes in market yields).  However, the book value is more relevant for a government issuing a security because the book value indicates the amount owing to the creditor at any moment.
In 2021, the book value of debt securities liabilities for the consolidated Canadian general government was about 1% lower than the market value ($2,187 billion at book value vs. $2,202 billion at market value), and about 2% higher for the federal government ($1,246 billion at book value vs. $1,227 billion at market value.)

Notes: Data are for 2021 (the fiscal year ending 31 March 2022).  The consolidated general government includes all federal (central), provincial, territorial and local governments.  Debt is measured at market value.  GDP in 2021 was $2,510 billion.

Sources: Statistics Canada, The Daily, Statistics Canada Tables 10-10-0147-01, 10-10-0016-01, and 36-10-0222-01.

Historical context
Overview  During the Great Depressiona severe global economic depression from 1929 to 1939the Canadian consolidated general government gross debt as a share of GDP exceeded 100%. It reached 150% following World War II. The ratio fell until the 1970s, then rose to over 100% in the mid-1990s.  The federal government's gross debt to GDP ratio fell from the mid-1990s, before rising briefly following the financial crisis of 2008-09.  It then resumed a downward trend until the pandemic-related spike in 2020.  By contrast, provincial government gross debt as a share of GDP has increased fairly steadily since the 1960s.

Government bond issues soared in 2020 to finance COVID-19 related spending, as shown in the figure below.  As a consequence, by the third quarter of 2020, the ratio of all government debt securities liabilities to GDP jumped to 95.3%, surpassing the 1995 peak of 93.7%.

The Fiscal consolidation of the 1990s  Successive years of federal budget deficits in the 1980s and early 1990s, and a rising debt to GDP ratio, led to concerns about debt sustainability. The federal government's deficit reached 8% measured as a share of GDP in 1983 and 1984, and from 1985 to 1990 Canada's public debt increased sharply from $USD166 billion to $USD290 billion with compounding interest accounting for more than 80% of the increase.  In 1990, then Prime Minister Brian Mulroney introduced a budget that included a two-year freeze on health care and post-secondary education transfers to the provinces, the elimination of cash grants to businesses, and a 5% cap on spending increases for foreign aid and the military.  Plans to privatize Petro-Canada were also announced, a continuation of the privatization program that began in the 1980s which included sales of 23 of Canada's 61 crown corporations, Air Canada, Havilland Aircraft of Canada, Canadian Arsenals, and Connaught Laboratories  These measures were expected to decrease the federal deficit from $USD25.3 billion to $USD8.3 billion by 1995.

An editorial in the Wall Street Journal in 1995 said Canada might need an International Monetary Fund bailout and called Canada "an honorary member of the Third World."  When Jean Chretien became Prime Minister in November 1993, he undertook a fiscal consolidation that was achieved mainly by big spending reductions. The ratio of spending cuts to tax hikes was seven-to-one. Tax revenues could not be boosted by much partly because Canada's top marginal income tax rate was already around 55%.  The policy shift represented "the biggest reduction in Canadian government spending since demobilization after World War Two."  By FY 1995-1996 the federal net debt to GDP ratio peaked at 68%, and a budget surplus was achieved within four years.

The Financial Crisis and the COVID-19 Pandemic  
In 2010, Canada's debt-to-GDP ratio was 77%.  During the period that included the 2008 financial crisis and the Great Recession, Stephen Harper's CPC government reported six straight years of budget deficits.  The federal debt (measured as the accumulated deficit) continued to increase after the financial crisis.  The net debt-to-GDP ratio increased to 33% in 2013, and then began a slight decline.

During 2020, the first year of the historic COVID-19 pandemic, the sum of all government liabilities (gross debt) reached $2,852 billion (129.2% as a ratio of GDP).  The consolidated general government (federal, provincial, territorial and local governments) posted an "historic deficit" of $325.5 billion to provide relief.  Issuances of financial instruments in 2020Q2 reached record highs, including an additional $234.4 billion in federal short term paper and an additional $65.7 billion in federal bonds.  Borrowing at the subnational level (mostly provincial government bonds) reached $62 billion.  By 2022Q2, the GDP increased and the federal government's net debt-to-GDP ratio was 35.4%, down from 36.8% in Q1.

During the COVID-19 pandemic, interest rates were at an historic low which meant that the massive deficit spending was easier to finance. Interest payments on debt represented approximately 1% of GDP early in the pandemic, compared to 6% in 1995, when it reached its highest level.  By mid-2021, interest payments on public debt were projected to rise for the federal government and nine of ten provinces.  For the fiscal year ending March 31, 2022, interest expense on government debt liabilities was $65 billion, or approximately 7 cents of every dollar of revenue and 2.6% as a percent of GDP. The same period saw an inflationary reduction in real debt of 6.8%, resulting in a decrease in real debt of $171 billion, or approximately 18 cents of every dollar of revenue and 6.8% as a percent of GDP.

Public debt of Canadian provinces, territories, and local governments (PTLG)  
The total financial liabilities or gross debt of the Canadian consolidated provincial, territorial and local governments (PTLG) was $1,460 billion in 2021 (the fiscal year ending 31 March 2022), as shown in the table below.  Provincial government gross debt is a substantial proportion of the $2,942 billion of public debt obligations of Canadians.  Consolidated PTLG gross debt is 58.2% measured as a percentage of GDP, almost as large as the federal government's 62.5%.

The value of provincial outstanding debt securities liabilities expressed as a percentage of GDP was lowest for British Columbia (26.1%) and highest for Manitoba (71.4%) in 2021. Debt securities provide a useful measure of debt because they comprise the largest component of gross debt and are relatively straightforward to measure.  (Another major component of gross debt, government employee pension plan liabilities, is more difficult to measure as it varies with a plan's investment returns and member longevity, for example.)  The outstanding debt securities issued by the consolidated provincial, territorial, and local governments (PTLGs), at 40.9% as a percentage of GDP, is smaller but similar in size to the federal government's 48.9%.

Notes: Data are for 2021 (the fiscal year ending 31 March 2022).  The consolidated general government includes all federal (central), provincial, territorial and local governments.  Debt is measured at market value. 
 
Sources: Statistics Canada Tables 10-10-0147-01, 10-10-0016-01 and 36-10-0222-01.

Data for the provincial governments are consolidated. "Consolidation is a method used to present one overarching statistic for a province that eliminates all transactions and debtor-creditor relationships among different government units within a province." These units include the "provincial government, health and social service institutions, universities and colleges, municipalities and other local public administrations, and school boards". "Consolidated data can be compared across provinces because consolidation takes into account differences in provincial administrative structures and government service delivery".

Consolidated data for the Canadian general government combines federal government data with provincial, territorial and local governments, but excludes data for the Canada Pension Plan and Quebec Pension Plan.

Provincial debt measurement: Public accounts vs. national accounts measures of debt   The Canadian Department of Finance provides measures of federal and provincial debt on a public accounts basis, using reports from individual governments.  An advantage of public accounts numbers is that they can provide detail on government expenditures.  However, they are not strictly comparable across jurisdictions.  By contrast, debt measured on a national accounts basis (employed in the table above) follows an internationally-agreed standard, in order to facilitate comparisons across countries and provinces.  According to the Department of Finance, the divergence between public accounts and national accounts measures arise from differences in the reporting of public sector pensions and other future benefits, methodological differences, and timing adjustments.

Debt held by foreign investors
In 1960, 4% of the Canadian government debt was held by foreign investors.

From 2009–2010 to 2013–2014, the amount of the Canadian's debt held by foreign investors increased from 15% to 27% with a peak of 30% in 2012–2013. According to 2012 and a 2014 Department of Finance reports, debt held by foreign investors was lower than or comparable to most G7 countries in 2013-2014, including France at 64%, Germany at 62%, United States at 48%, Italy at 33%, United Kingdom at 29%, and Japan at 8%.Department of Finance Canada, Debt Management Report 2013–2014, http://www.fin.gc.ca/dtman/2013-2014/dmr-rgd1401-eng.asp#toc12  In 2021 (the fiscal year ending 31 March 2022) non-resident investors held 29% of Government of Canada securities, up from 24% in the previous year, which the Department of Finance described as "in the mid-range compared to other sovereigns in the G7."

 Risk factors: interest rates, economic growth, and currency valuation changes 

Major risk factors that can increase government debt include slowing economic growth, rising interest rates, and a decline in the value of the Canadian dollar.

Rising interest rates increase public debt charges, raising government expenditures.  From 2011 to 2021, falling rates meant that while public debt rose, public debt charges decreased from $29 billion to $24 billion.  The average interest paid on the federal debt was 4.6% in FY2007–2008, and by FY2020-2021 it was 1.4%.  However, economist Don Drummond, a former Finance Department assistant deputy minister, said in October 2020 that the interest rate on public debt would certainly rise from the level at that time, which was by far the lowest in post-war experience.  With federal government debt over $1 trillion, every one percentage point rise in the effective interest rate adds more than $10 billion per year to the federal deficit.

Drummond also noted that slow economic growth would reduce government tax revenue.  Further, slower growth of GDP relative to growth of debt will increase the ratio of debt to GDP.

As of 2019, the International Monetary Fund views exchange rate risk as low for Canada because 90% of general government outstanding marketable debt instruments are denominated in Canadian dollars.  For the 10% of debt denominated in foreign currency, there is exchange rate risk since if the Canadian dollar falls in value, a larger quantity of Canadian dollars is needed to repay the debt.

 Debt comparison with other countries 

The level of government (central, state, or local) responsible for government programs differs across countries.  For this reason, international fiscal comparisons are usually made on a total government, national accounts basis.  For Canada, total government includes the federal (central), provincial/territorial, and local governments.  Another reason to measure debt on a total government basis is that the federal government may be viewed as responsible for the debt of other levels of government.  Credit rating agency Fitch said it expects the federal government to provide a province with access to debt markets, as it did early in the coronavirus pandemic.  When Newfoundland needed debt repayment assistance in March 2020, it appealed to the federal government.  Any aid delivered to one province would reduce the resources the federal government has available for its own debt repayment responsibilities, and to support debt repayment in other provinces.  

The International Monetary Fund's (IMF) World Economic Outlook reports that for 2021 Canada's net debt-to-GDP ratio was 32% and the gross debt-to-GDP ratio was 113%.  According to the IMF, for the last 15 years, Canada had the lowest net debt-to-GDP ratio, at around 33%, among G7 countries.  The IMF notes that Canada's general government holds sizable financial assets (about 67.5% of GDP), including pension fund investment assets.  The IMF's net debt calculation excludes unfunded pension liabilities, as they are not reported by many other countries.  Also, Canada's general government debt includes sizable accounts payable (around 19 percent of GDP), which many advanced economies do not report.  If these were excluded, Canada's gross debt would be smaller.

The general government gross debt to GDP ratio for countries the IMF classifies as Advanced economies that have a population of at least 5 million is shown in the table below. In 2021, Canada had the fourth highest level of gross public debt as a percent of GDP among the G7 – lower than Japan, Italy and the United States, but higher than Germany, the United Kingdom and France.

General Government Gross Debt, Percent of GDPSource: International Monetary Fund, World Economic Outlook Database'', October 2022.  Numbers for 2021 are IMF staff estimates for Austria, Israel, Japan, New Zealand, and Sweden.

Public debt sustainability 

In its staff report released in 2019, before the COVID-19 pandemic, the International Monetary Fund says the Canadian federal government experienced favorable economic conditions since the 2018 budget that led to sizeable windfall gains: higher than anticipated revenue collections, lower transfers to households, and lower projected interest rates.  On the other hand, pressures loom large on the horizon at the provincial level, with annual health care spending growth expected to rise from 3% to 4½% over a 10-20 year timeframe, contributing to rising net debt to GDP ratios by around 2025.

The July 2022 Fiscal Sustainability Report by the Parliamentary Budget Officer (PBO) said that while the current fiscal policy of the federal government and the Quebec, Alberta, Saskatchewan and Nova Scotia governments was sustainable over the long-term, this was not the case for all provincial and territorial governments.  The report is based on a 75-year projection horizon and has assessed that the combination of public pension plans; federal government; and provincial, territorial and local governments are sustainable over that period.

Credit ratings

A credit rating provides an indication of the sustainability of a government's debt, as it shows the rating agency's view of the ability of a borrower to "meet financial commitments".  Credit rating agencies report on Canada's credit strength and their reports are used by investorsincluding sovereign wealth and pension funds. A credit rating may affect borrowing costs.  Standard & Poor rates Canada's credit at AAA; Moody's is Aaa; Fitch's is AA+, and DBRS's is AAA.  In 2022, all four credit rating agencies evaluate Canada's credit with a stable outlook. As of March 2022, Canada's DBRS AAA credit rating was maintained in response to expectations of the decline in the federal fiscal deficit 14.6% of GDP in FY 2020-2021 to 2.2% in FY 2022-2023.

See also
 Canadian federal budget
 Taxation in Canada
 Economy of Canada
 Ontario debt
 Debt-to-GDP ratio

General:
 Government debt
 Government budget deficit

International:
 List of sovereign states by public debt

Notes

References

External links
Canadian Debt Clock, by the Canadian Taxpayers Federation
Canadian Governments Compared

 
Economy of Canada